The Provincial Assembly of Balochistan is a unicameral legislature of elected representatives of the Pakistani province of Balochistan, and is located in Quetta, the provincial capital. It was established under Article 106 of the Constitution of Pakistan having a total of 65 seats, with 51 general seats, 11 seats reserved for women and 3 reserved for non-Muslims.

The Assembly has 51 directly elected Members of the Provincial Assembly, representing constituencies from each district, as well as 11 seats reserved for women and 3 for non-Muslims.
Abdul Quddus Bizenjo is the Leader of the House in the Provincial Assembly as the Chief Minister, while Malik Sikandar Khan is the current Leader of the Opposition.

List of speakers

List of Assembles of Balochistan

References

External links 

 Official website
 Provincial Assembly of Balochistan on Twitter

 
B
Government of Balochistan, Pakistan
Unicameral legislatures